Been There, Seen That, Done That was Something Happens' first studio album. At the time of its release the band had built up a large fan-base both in Ireland and abroad.

This album was mentioned in an episode of Life On The World To Come, an apocalyptic comedy podcast created by Chris Dunne co-hosted by Will Wood. The episode mentioning the album, is The Valentines Day Special: Part II

Track listing
All songs written and arranged by Something Happens.  Copyright Virgin Music Publishers Ltd.
 "Beach" - 3:28
 "Incoming" - 2:43
 "Take This With You" - 3:28
 "Forget Georgia" - 3:44
 "The Way I Feel" - 3:23
 "Both Men Crying" - 2:20
 "Burn Clear" - 3:18
 "Give It Away" - 3:24
 "Tall Girls Club" - 3:30
 "Shoulder High" - 2:41
 "Here Comes the Only One Again" - 3:06
 "Be My Love" - 3:07

Personnel

Something Happens
Tom Dunne - vocals
Ray Harmon - guitars, backing vocals
Alan Byrne - bass, acoustic guitars
Eamonn Ryan - drums, backing vocals
Additional Personnel
Don Knox - viola, mandolin
John Ryan - keyboards, piano
Sean Garvey - accordion

Production
Produced and Recorded by Tom Erdelyi, except "Incoming" and "Tall Girls' Club"; produced and recorded by Vic Maile
Assistant Recording Engineers: John Grimes (Windmill Lane), Richard Joseph (Unique Studios), Colin Simpkins (EMI Studio J)
Mixed by Steven Chase, except "Burn Clear" and "Here Comes the Only One Again"; mixed by Tom Erdelyi

References

External links
Been There, Seen That, Done That at Allmusic.com

1988 debut albums
Something Happens albums
Virgin Records albums
albums produced by Vic Maile
albums produced by Tommy Ramone